JS Natsushio (SS-584) was the second ship of the submarine of Japan Maritime Self-Defense Force.

Development and design 

This type is a teardrop type ship type, a so-called SSS (Single Screw Submarine) type with a single-axis propulsion system, and the structural style is a complete double-shell structure, following the method since the Uzushio-class (42SS) in the basic design concept . Meanwhile, the type, dual vibration-damping support of the anti-vibration support or main engine of the main motor, the auxiliary equipment and pipe systems, static power supply, and rectification of the hole opening on the bottom of the ship. Through these efforts, it was decided that the masker sound insulation device was unnecessary, and in the latter model of this model, it was so quiet that it would not be detected even if snorkeling was continued until the sonobuoy was visible.

Construction and career 
Natsushio was laid down at Kawasaki Heavy Industries Kobe Shipyard on 8 April 1988 as the 1987 plan 2400-ton submarine No. 8099 and it was launched on 20 March 1990. She was commissioned on 20 March 1991 and homeported in Kure. She belonged to the 5th Submarine of the 1st Submarine Group.

She participated in the RIMPAC 1996.

On 3 August 1997, she sank the target ship JDS Nagatsuki north of Wakasa Bay.

On 8 May 2000, her and JS Kongō left Kure to participated in RIMPAC 2000 which took place from 30 May until 6 July.

She took part in RIMPAC 2002.

She was decommissioned on 26 March 2010. She also participated in 10 Maritime Self-Defense Force exercises and 8 simulated combat trainings between submarines. She was scrapped in Etajima in 2011.

Gallery

Citations

External links

Ships built by Kawasaki Heavy Industries
1990 ships
Harushio-class submarines